There are several convention centres in the Netherlands. Traditionally there is a distinction in the Netherlands between convention centres for meetings and those for exhibitions/trade shows. Over the past decades this distinction has become blurred, as exhibition facilities have added meeting rooms and meeting centred venues have opened exhibition halls. Also, most of the bigger hotels have built meeting rooms, some of them for large scale (international) gatherings.

The following list is sorted by province:

Drenthe
 Prins Bernhardhoeve, Zuidlaren: 16.000 m² (0,006 mi²)

Friesland
 WTC Expo, Leeuwarden: 30.000 m² (0,01 mi²)

Gelderland
 GelreDome, Arnhem

Groningen
 MartiniPlaza, Groningen

Limburg
 MECC, Maastricht: 30.000 m² (0,01 mi²)

North Brabant
 Evoluon, Eindhoven
 NH Conference Centre Koningshof, Veldhoven: 9.000m²

North Holland
 Amsterdam RAI Exhibition and Convention Centre, Amsterdam: 112.200 m²
 Beurs van Berlage, Amsterdam: 18.000 m² (up to 1300 delegates)

South Holland
 Ahoy, Rotterdam
 De Broodfabriek, Rijswijk
 De Doelen, Rotterdam
 World Forum Convention Center, The Hague
 GIA Trade & Exhibition Centre, The Hague

Utrecht
 Jaarbeurs, Utrecht: 100.000 m² (0,04 mi²)

 
Convention